Fire Songs  is a collection of poetry written by English poet David Harsent that uses multiple themes to display a greater meaning. It was published in 2014, and it won the T.S. Eliot Prize that year. It is the 11th collection of poems that Harsent has published.

Overview
Fire Songs, according to Fiona Sampson, a British poet and a judge for the 2015 T.S. Eliot Prize, teems with images and ideas that manage to be both richly detailed and vividly musical. The entire book reads as a triumphantly sustained sequence and is layered with leitmotifs. It is denser and more composed than its prize-winning predecessors Legion (2005) and Night (2010). The four "Fire" sequences all have a common theme, destruction. Martyrdom, war, the loss of love and environmental apocalypse end each sequence to repeat the threat "it will be fire". Other recurring themes are rats, tinnitus, war, and environmental damage. Harsent, who suffers from tinnitus, said he "wrote them [the poems] in a fever".

Structure

Fire: a song for Mistress Askew

 The Fool Alone
 Bowland Beth
 Sang The Rat
 Tinnitus: August, sun beating the rooftops
 A Dream Book
 Leechdoms and Starcrafts
 The Fool at Court

Fire: love songs and descants

 Effacted
 Tinnitus: May, low skies and thunder
 Rat Again
 Armistice

Fire: end-scenes and outtakes

 Trickster Christ
 Dive
 Songs from the Same Earth
Tinnitus: January, thin rain becoming ice

Fire: a party at the world's end

 Icefield
 M.A.D. 1971 (Rat-run)
 Pain

Content
"Fire: a song for Mistress Askew" is set in London, England, and follows Anne Askew, an English writer and Protestant Martyr who was condemned for being a heretic during the dynasty of Henry VIII, and became the only woman in English history to be tortured in the Tower of London and burnt at the stake. Harsent describes the execution of Askew because "She was an example of the destructiveness of fire". "Fire: love songs and descants", according to Guardian reviewer Adam Newey, has a "hellish for-its-own-sake purity, which is nonetheless impressive and mesmerizing", and like the Askew group includes a bonfire to introduce the poem's subject matter. In this poem, the speaker is burning works of arts and literature, and burning of the written word is a recurrent motif. It reveals the theme the loss of love as the speaker no longer loves literature. In an interview with Prospect magazine, Harsent commented on the bonfire motif in Fire Songs: "I had this image in my head of a man going into his garden and making a bonfire on which he planned to burn everything".

The poem "Tinnitus" addresses Harsent's musical career; Harsent frequently collaborates with British composer Harrison Birtwistle, and Harsent dedicated the volume to him. The poem "Armistice" consists of one single sentence, without punctuation, organized in couplets all of which rhyme on the sound of the letter "d". Newey called this a "virtuosic piece" that "disdains simplistic notions about peace and war and has the humility to acknowledge the limits of art".

Reception 
Adam Newey, in The Guardian, said the collection "makes rich use of symbol, especially biblical symbol, and reads somewhat like a modern-day Book of Revelation – there’s definitely something of the entranced, ecstatic visionary in some of the bravura pieces here". He added that it "delivers a stream of feverish, oneiric visions, of apocalypse brought about through war or environmental catastrophe or the boundless human capacity for self‑deception and bedevilment". According to Helen Dunmore, a British poet and the chair of judges that awarded David Harsent the T.S. Eliot Prize, "Fire Songs plumbs language and emotion with technical brilliance and prophetic power".

References

2014 poetry books
English poetry collections
Faber and Faber books
T. S. Eliot Prize-winning works